María Calcaño (Maracaibo, 1906 – Caracas, 1956) was a Venezuelan poet.

She was married at 14, and had six children before the age of 27. Her success as a poet was belated, and she preferred to talk about a subversive eroticism in her poems instead of aesthetic patterns or social topics, which were the main subjects of her contemporaries.

Quotations
'Había olvidado las muñecas / por venirme con él 
(I had forgotten the dolls / to come along with him)

Canciones que oyeron mis últimas muñecas (1956)

Books
Alas fatales (1935)
Canciones que oyeron mis últimas muñecas (1956)
Entre la luna y los hombres (1961), after her death.

Venezuelan women writers
People from Maracaibo
1906 births
1956 deaths